Sarayu Rao (born March 7, 1975), also known as Sarayu R. Blue, is an American actress. She is perhaps best known for her recurring role as Angela on the Fox sitcom Sons of Tucson, as well as Dr. Sydney Napur on David E. Kelley's Monday Mornings on TNT. She has also guest starred in a number of television series.

Acting career
Rao's first notable acting role came in the 2007 film Lions for Lambs, co-starring with Robert Redford, Tom Cruise, and Meryl Streep. She has had guest roles in numerous TV shows, such as Veep, Bones, The Big Bang Theory, HawthoRNe, NCIS: Los Angeles, and Two and a Half Men. In 2010, she had a recurring role as Angela on the Fox sitcom Sons of Tucson; the show lasted one season. In 2012, Sarayu was cast as Dr. Sydney Napur, a series regular on David E. Kelley's medical drama Monday Mornings (TNT). In 2018, the actress became the lead in NBC TV series, I Feel Bad. It was cancelled after season 1. In the same year Rao was paired opposite John Cena in the Universal Pictures comedy Blockers.

Personal life
Rao was born in Madison, Wisconsin, to a Telugu family from India. Her parents are Velcheru Narayana Rao and Nidadavolu Malathi, who is a writer of short stories and articles, in Telugu and English. She married Jonathan Blue, the Director of Creative Development at ReKon Productions. Rao attended West High School in Madison. She earned her Master of Fine Arts degree in acting in 2005 from the American Conservatory Theater in  San Francisco.

Filmography

Film

Television

References

External links
 
 

1975 births
Living people
21st-century American actresses
Actors from Madison, Wisconsin
Actresses from Wisconsin
American actresses of Indian descent
American Conservatory Theater alumni
American film actresses
American people of Telugu descent
American stage actresses
American television actresses
American voice actresses
Madison West High School alumni
Telugu actresses